John Stembridge is a Professor of Mathematics at University of Michigan. He received his Ph.D. from Massachusetts Institute of Technology in 1985 under the direction of Richard P. Stanley. His dissertation was called Combinatorial Decompositions of Characters of SL(n,C).

He is one of the participants in the Atlas of Lie Groups and Representations.

Research 
His research interests are in combinatorics, with particular emphasis on the following areas:
Topics related to algebra, especially representation theory
Coxeter groups and root systems
Enumerative combinatorics
Symmetric functions
Hypergeometric series and q-series
Computational problems and algorithms in algebra

He was awarded a Guggenheim Fellowship in 2000 for work in Combinatorial aspects of root systems and Weyl characters..

He has written Maple packages that can be used for computing symmetric functions, posets, root systems, and finite Coxeter groups.

References

Living people
Year of birth missing (living people)
20th-century American mathematicians
21st-century American mathematicians
Massachusetts Institute of Technology School of Science alumni
University of Michigan faculty